Toodyay Naturalists Club was founded in 1968 in Toodyay, Western Australia.

The inaugural meeting was held at St Stephen's Anglican Church Hall.

In 1979 the club published a book about the local environment.

It was the main mover in the creation of the Pioneers Arboretum.

In 2004 it conducted a symposium on James Drummond.

It celebrated 30 years of activity in 1998, and 40 in 2008.

Notes

External links
 Toodyay Naturalists' Club website

Toodyay, Western Australia
1968 establishments in Australia
Clubs and societies in Western Australia